Phostria tridentalis is a moth in the family Crambidae. It was described by George Hampson in 1912. It is found in Peru.

References

Phostria
Moths described in 1912
Moths of South America